Kosmos 17 ( meaning Cosmos 17), also known as DS-A1 No.2 was a technology demonstration satellite which was launched by the Soviet Union in 1963. It was launched as part of the Dnepropetrovsk Sputnik programme. Its primary mission was to demonstrate technologies for future Soviet military satellites. It also conducted radiation experiments.

Spacecraft
The DS-A1 satellites were developed by Yuzhnoye to test the techniques and equipment for communication and navigation systems and performed radiation measurements.

Launch
Kosmos 17 was launched aboard a Kosmos-2I 63S1 rocket, flying from pad 2 of the Mayak-2 at Kapustin Yar. The launch occurred at 03:07:00 GMT on 22 May 1963.

Mission
It decayed on 2 June 1965. Kosmos 17 was the second of seven DS-A1 satellites to be launched. The previous DS-A1 was Kosmos 11. The next two DS-A1 launches failed (22 August 1963 and 24 October 1963), before Kosmos 53 successfully reached orbit on 30 January 1965. The technological experiments aboard Kosmos 17 were tests of communications and navigation systems which were later used on the GLONASS system.

See also

 1962 in spaceflight

References

Spacecraft launched in 1963
Kosmos 0017
1963 in the Soviet Union
Dnepropetrovsk Sputnik program